Comitas kaipara is an extinct species of sea snail, a marine gastropod mollusc in the family Pseudomelatomidae.

Description
The length of the shell attains 19 mm, its diameter 6.3 mm.

Distribution
This marine species is endemic to New Zealand. Fossils have been in Cenozoic strata

References

 Maxwell, P.A. (2009). Cenozoic Mollusca. pp 232–254 in Gordon, D.P. (ed.) New Zealand inventory of biodiversity. Volume one. Kingdom Animalia: Radiata, Lophotrochozoa, Deuterostomia. Canterbury University Press, Christchurch

External links
 Worldwide Mollusc Species Data Base: Comitas kaipara

kaipara
Gastropods described in 1939
Gastropods of New Zealand